Giuseppe Corradi (7 July 1932 – 22 July 2002) was an Italian professional football player and coach who played as a defender.

Honours

Club
Juventus
 Serie A champion: 1951–52, 1957–58.
 Coppa Italia winner: 1958–59.

International
 Represented Italy at the 1952 Summer Olympics

References

External links
 Career summary by playerhistory.com
 

1932 births
2002 deaths
Italian footballers
Italy international footballers
Serie A players
Modena F.C. players
Juventus F.C. players
Genoa C.F.C. players
Mantova 1911 players
Olympic footballers of Italy
Footballers at the 1952 Summer Olympics
Italian football managers
Pisa S.C. managers
U.S. Lecce managers
Spezia Calcio managers
Association football defenders